Spartanburg Methodist College is a private Methodist college in Saxon, South Carolina, with a Spartanburg postal address. The college serves approximately 1,000 students (2020-2021 academic year). The college awards six associate degrees, a customizable bachelor's degree with six concentrations, a bachelor's degree in business administration, and nine 100% online associate and bachelor's degree programs.

Accreditation and affiliations 

Spartanburg Methodist College is accredited by the Southern Association of Colleges and Schools Commission on Colleges and the University Senate of the United Methodist Church. It is affiliated with the United Methodist Church and with the South Carolina Annual Conference.

Academics 

SMC offers six associate degrees, a customizable bachelor's degree with six concentrations, a bachelor's degree in business administration, and nine 100% online associate and bachelor's degree programs. 

All bachelor's degrees include what SMC calls "The Camak Core." The Camak Core, named for SMC's founder, David English Camak, is a required 6 courses – or 18 hours of degree credit – of professional development (soft skills and experiences for personal and career success). The Camak Core makes up one-third of student's total bachelor's degree hours.

Athletics 

The college is a Division I member of Region X of the National Junior College Athletic Association (NJCAA). Region X includes colleges in the Carolinas, West Virginia, and Virginia. SMC offers 14 intercollegiate athletic programs which include Men's and Women's Soccer, Men's and Women's Tennis, Men's and Women's Golf, Men's and Women's Basketball, Men's and Women's Cross Country, Softball, Volleyball (indoor and beach), Baseball and Wrestling. The college's athletic teams have won numerous regional, divisional, and national titles.

The men's soccer team won the 1994 NJCAA national championship. Several other teams have made appearances in their respective NJCAA (JUCO) Division I national tournaments in recent years — most recently women's golf (three individual Top 50 finishes, 2011), men's tennis (26th-place finish, 2010), wrestling (29th-place finish, 2010), men's cross country (2nd place, 2012), women's cross country (16th place, 2009), men's and women's half marathon (3rd place, 2012) and volleyball (16th-place finish, 2009).

Temporary Services led by All American Coach/Quarterback Christian Sessions and All American Left Guard/Defensive End.

The women's soccer team played USC Upstate in an exhibition on 22 August 2021 in an exhibition, a match they lost 11-0.

Notable alumni
Alumni of the college include professional baseball players Orlando Hudson, Reggie Sanders, Dwight Smith, Sebastián Velásquez. The first graduating class of the college include SC Governor and Senator Olin D. Johnston. Bodybuilder Lee Haney attended the school.

References

External links 
 
 Official website

 
Private universities and colleges in South Carolina
United Methodist Church
Educational institutions established in 1911
Universities and colleges accredited by the Southern Association of Colleges and Schools
Education in Spartanburg County, South Carolina
Buildings and structures in Spartanburg County, South Carolina
NJCAA athletics
1911 establishments in South Carolina